Besmelyata is a rural locality (a village) in Dobryansky District, Perm Krai, Russia. The population was 3 as of 2010. There are 2 streets.

Geography 
Besmelyata is located 44 km west of Dobryanka (the district's administrative centre) by road. Tyulka is the nearest rural locality.

References 

Rural localities in Dobryansky District